Tellebang is a rural locality in the North Burnett Region, Queensland, Australia. In the  Tellebang had a population of 63 people.

History 
Tellebang State School opened on 16 February 1931 and closed on 31 December 1965.

In the  Tellebang had a population of 63 people.

References

Further reading 

  — includes Tellebang State School

North Burnett Region
Localities in Queensland